Oleg II Svyatoslavich was prince of Novgorod-Seversk until the year 1180.

Year of birth missing
Year of death missing
People from Novhorod-Siverskyi
Princes of Novgorod